The 2011 Scheldeprijs cycling race took place on 9 April 2011. It was the 99th time the Scheldeprijs was run. Mark Cavendish won the race for a third time equally the record of Piet Oellibrandt.

Results

External links

2011
Scheldeprijs
Scheldeprijs